Billburttia is a genus of flowering plants belonging to the family Apiaceae.

Its native range is Madagascar.

Species:

Billburttia capensoides 
Billburttia vaginoides

References

Apioideae